Yannick Ayrton Franke (born May 21, 1996) is a Dutch professional basketball player for PAOK Thessaloniki of the Greek Basket League. He also represents the Netherlands national basketball team in international competition. Franke mainly plays at the shooting guard position and occasionally as a point guard.

Professional career
Franke started his professional career with the Dutch powerhouse ZZ Leiden in the 2013–14 season. In December he transferred to lower-ranked Challenge Sports Rotterdam, where he could get more playing time.

In the 2014–15 season, Franke had a break-out year. He was the youngest scoring champion in the history of the Dutch DBL, after he recorded 19.6 points per game at age 19. He also won the DBL MVP Under 23 and DBL Most Improved Player Awards.

For the 2015–16 season, Franke signed with Donar Groningen. On 15 February 2016, Franke left Donar.

On February 29, 2016, he signed for the remainder of the season with Bisons Loimaa in Finland.

On September 20, 2016, Franke signed with Promitheas Patras in Greece, but left the team without appearing in a single game. On October 16, 2016, he signed a three-year contract with AEK Athens in Greece, but was released on November 25, without appearing in an official game of the team. 

On January 11, 2017, he signed with Croatian club Zadar. On March 31, 2017, he left Zadar after averaging 6 points and 2 rebounds per game in the ABA League.

On August 11, 2017, Franke signed a two-year deal with Italian club Aquila Basket Trento. In the 2017–18 LBA season, Franke reached the finals with Trento, where it lost to Olimpia Milano.

In October 2018, Franke signed with Pieno žvaigždės of the Lithuanian LKL.

On July 12, 2019, Franke signed a one-year contract with Hamburg Towers of the German Basketball Bundesliga (BBL).

On August 8, 2020, Franke signed with SLUC Nancy of the French LNB Pro B.

On December 17, 2020, Franke signed with Start Lublin.

On August 2, 2021, he signed with Trefl Sopot of the Polish Basketball League.

On March 2, 2022, he signed with MoraBanc Andorra of the Liga ACB.

On July 11, 2022, Franke signed with PAOK of the Greek Basket League and the Basketball Champions League.

International career
Franke made his debut for the Dutch national basketball team on 31 July 2015 in a 55–59 loss against Germany. Franke was a member of the Dutch team that played at EuroBasket 2015, where the team had a 1–4 record. Franke played in one game, a 72–78 loss against Croatia, and he scored 3 points in the match.

Family 
Franke comes from a much-lauded basketball family. Father Rolf Franke was eight times Dutch basketball champion in the 1990s, played 60 international matches for the Netherlands  and was the coach of ZZ Leiden from 2018 to 2020. Grandfather Wim Franke was regarded as one of the best basketball players in the country in the 1960s and made 47 international appearances.

Honours

Individual
DBL All-Rookie Team: 2014–15
DBL Most Improved Player: 2014–15
DBL MVP Under 23: 2014–15
DBL All-Star: 2015
DBL scoring champion: 2014–15
All Imports team LKL Lithuanian 2018-19
All German BBL Honorable mention 2019-20

References

External links
Eurobasket.com profile

1996 births
Living people
ABA League players
Aquila Basket Trento players
BC Andorra players
BC Pieno žvaigždės players
Bisons Loimaa players
B.S. Leiden players
Donar (basketball club) players
Dutch men's basketball players
Dutch expatriate basketball people in Estonia
Dutch Basketball League players
Feyenoord Basketball players
Hamburg Towers players
SLUC Nancy Basket players
KK Zadar players
P.A.O.K. BC players
Point guards
Shooting guards
Sportspeople from Haarlem
Trefl Sopot players
Dutch expatriate basketball people in Greece
Dutch expatriate basketball people in Finland
Dutch expatriate basketball people in Croatia
Dutch expatriate basketball people in Italy
Dutch expatriate basketball people in France
Dutch expatriate basketball people in Lithuania
Dutch expatriate basketball people in Andorra
Dutch expatriate basketball people in Poland